Gümligen railway station is a railway station in the municipality of Muri bei Bern, in the Swiss canton of Bern. It is located at the junction of the standard gauge Bern–Lucerne and Bern–Thun lines of Swiss Federal Railways.

Services 
The following services stop at Gümligen:

 Bern S-Bahn:

References

External links 
 
 

Railway stations in the canton of Bern
Swiss Federal Railways stations